The velvet-fronted grackle (Lampropsar tanagrinus) is a species of bird in the family Icteridae, monotypic within the genus Lampropsar. It is found in Bolivia, Brazil, Colombia, Ecuador, Guyana, Peru, and Venezuela where its natural habitats are subtropical or tropical swamps and heavily degraded former forest.

Description
Both sexes are entirely black, with a slight bluish gloss on the dorsal surfaces. The feathers at the front of the crown are very short and dense, giving a velvet-like appearance at close quarters. The beak is short, conical and pointed, the iris is dark and the tail is long and somewhat rounded. The calls produced include a crackling "chack" and a whistling "cheziit", and the song, sometimes sung at dusk from a perch, is a moderately-musical rapid gurgling sound. This species could be confused with the shiny cowbird (Molothrus bonariensis), but their calls and habits are quite different.

Distribution and habitat
The velvet-fronted grackle has two separate populations; one is in Venezuela and Guyana; the other is in southern Colombia, eastern Ecuador, northern Peru, western Brazil and northern and central Bolivia. Its typical habitat is várzea forests which periodically become flooded, forest borders and swamps near ponds; rivers and lakes.

Behaviour
This species often congregates with others of its kind in small groups of up to about twenty birds. Sometimes these coalesce with groups of tanagers and caciques. The birds move noisily through the canopy, foraging high and low, and sometimes hopping around on floating vegetation on lakes. The diet includes insects such as winged ants and beetles but is poorly described. In Guyana it breeds in March, in Ecuador in September and in Bolivia in October and February.

Status
The International Union for Conservation of Nature has classified L. tanagrinus as being of "least concern". This is on the basis that the bird has a very wide range, the population is believed to be steady, and the bird is fairly common.

References 

velvet-fronted grackle
Birds of Venezuela
Birds of the Amazon Basin
Birds of the Peruvian Amazon
Birds of the Bolivian Amazon
velvet-fronted grackle
Taxonomy articles created by Polbot